The Fajr-3 is a multiple-launch artillery rocket, a third-generation Katyusha rocket.

Fajr-3 may also refer to:
 Fajr-3 (missile), a medium-range ballistic missile with an unknown range
 Fajr-3 (aircraft), an Iranian four-seat aircraft
 Operation Dawn 3 (a.k.a. Operation Valfajr-3), an Iranian offensive in the 8-year long Iran-Iraq War

See also
 Fajr (disambiguation)